Apollinariya Alexandrovna Yakubova (Russian: Аполлинария Александровна Якубова, died 1913 or 1917) was a Russian Marxist revolutionary and, with Vladimir Lenin, one of the founders of the League of Struggle for the Emancipation of the Working Class.

Career 
Yakubova was the daughter of a priest, and studied physics and mathematics in St. Petersburg. After escaping a prison camp in Siberia where she had been held for her revolutionary activity, Yakubova and her husband fled to London around 1900, where she was active in organizing debates on communist doctrine.

She became close friends with Lenin's wife Nadezhda Krupskaya and also associated closely with Lenin when he was in  London, although the two eventually fell out over doctrinal disagreements. The American journalist Louis Fischer advanced, in 1964, the theory that she rejected a proposal of marriage by Lenin, and whether for this reason or another, she also earned the enmity of her former friend Krupskaya.

Yakubova returned to Russia with her husband in 1908, but what became of her then is unknown, and her date of death is variously given as 1913 or 1917. According to the historian Robert Henderson, "be it by decree of Lenin, or Krupskaya, or for some other entirely different reason, [Yakubova] appears to have been almost written out of history".

After 1905 she moved away from active political activity. She returned from abroad after the amnesty was announced, and continued teaching at the school for workers.

In 1909-1910 she lived in Finland, she lived in the cottage of N. M. Knipovich.  seriously ill with tuberculosis.  [So says the - very much longer - here Google translated - Russian version of this article. I do not know how accurate it is.]

She died in 1917 in Stirsudden, at Knipovich's cottage.

Notes 
 Also romanized as Apollinaria Yakubova, or as Apollinariia Iakubova.

References

External link

Russian communists
1913 deaths